Let You Down may refer to:
 "Let You Down" (NF song), 2017
 "Let You Down" (Peking Duk song), 2017
 "Let You Down" (Seether song), 2017
 "Let You Down", song by Three Days Grace from the album Three Days Grace, 2003

See also
 Won't Let You Down (disambiguation)
 I Won't Let You Down (disambiguation)